Craig Derek Mahon (born 21 June 1989) is an Irish footballer who plays as a winger for National League North club Curzon Ashton. He has played in the Football League for Accrington Stanley.

Early life
Craig Derek Mahon was born on 21 June 1989 in Dublin.

Club career
Mahon's footballing education took place at the Dublin-based club Lourdes Celtic, from there he signed as trainee in the 2006–07 season at Wigan Athletic he then progressed through the ranks. He signed a one-year professional contract with Wigan in June 2008.

Mahon signed for Accrington Stanley on loan in the 2008–09 season. He made his debut on 29 November 2008 in a League Two match against Bury, which ended in a 2–1 home defeat for Accrington.

In the summer of 2009, he was released by Wigan and went on to have a short spell with Salford City.

After trials at Football League clubs Bury and Rochdale, Mahon signed for Conference North club Vauxhall Motors on 4 September 2010. He signed a further one-year contract on 26 July 2011. The club secured the services of Mahon on a further one-year contract on 27 July 2012. He was voted the Vauxhall Motors Player of the Season for the 2012–13 season.

Mahon signed for Conference Premier club Chester on 23 May 2013. He remained at Chester for eight years, which included loan spells with AFC Fylde and Ashton United.

On 7 November 2014, Mahon became the father of twins. The following day Mahon was back on the pitch playing for Chester against Football League team Southend United in the FA Cup first round. Mahon had further cause for celebration by scoring the winning goal in the 51st minute, the match ending 2–1 to Chester as they pulled off a surprise victory against higher-ranked opponents.

On 12 September 2017, Mahon broke the all-time appearance record for Chester, with 160 appearances for the club. He went on to make 215 appearances for the club.

In January 2020, Mahon signed for Altrincham. He was part of the Altrincham team that were promoted to the National League on 1 August 2020 beating Boston United 1–0 in the play-off final.

Mahon signed for National League North club Curzon Ashton in September 2020. He signed a further one-year contract as a player-coach in August 2021. In October, he took the role of interim manager for three games, whilst the club recruited a new manager.

International career
Mahon represented the Republic of Ireland at youth level, making his debut for the under-18 team on 7 February 2007 in a 0–0 draw against the Netherlands. He appeared for the under-19 team later in the year, playing in a 2–1 defeat against Chile.

Career statistics

Honours
Altrincham
National League North play-offs: 2020

References

External links

Profile at the Curzon Ashton F.C. website

1989 births
Living people
Association footballers from Dublin (city)
Republic of Ireland association footballers
Association football wingers
Wigan Athletic F.C. players
Accrington Stanley F.C. players
Salford City F.C. players
Burscough F.C. players
Vauxhall Motors F.C. players
Chester F.C. players
AFC Fylde players
Ashton United F.C. players
Altrincham F.C. players
players
English Football League players
National League (English football) players
Northern Premier League players
Republic of Ireland youth international footballers
Republic of Ireland expatriate association footballers
Expatriate footballers in England
Irish expatriate sportspeople in England